Whitwick White Cross F.C. was an English football club.

History
The club joined Midland League in 1901 after a year in the Leicestershire League. They spent three years in the Midland League before resigning. The club rejoined the Leicestershire League in 1934 but folded in 1948.

While in the Midland League, they also competed in the FA Cup, reaching the 4th Qualifying Round in 1903.

Former players
1. Players that have played/managed in the Football League or any foreign equivalent to this level (i.e. fully professional league).
2. Players with full international caps.
3. Players that hold a club record or have captained the club.
 Harry Parker
 George Richards
 Jack Sheffield

References

Defunct football clubs in England
Defunct football clubs in Leicestershire
Midland Football League (1889)